Southern Stars is the fourth album by Australian hard rock band Rose Tattoo.

Southern Stars, with a slick production by Vanda & Young, had the band moving in a more AOR style, but retaining their famous Rock/boogie style. The album was essentially made with Angry Anderson and Geordie Leach on bass guitar, and new members Greg Jordon (slide/lead guitar), John Meyer (guitar) and Scott Johnston (drums). The album includes their Australian hit single I Wish. Rose Tattoo toured Australia upon the release of the album and the album was well received, but by late 1985, Angry Anderson had put the band into a hiatus due to acting commitments. It was the last Rose Tattoo album to be produced by Harry Vanda & George Young.

Track listing
 "Southern Stars" (Anderson, Jordon, Meyer)
 "Let Us Live" (Anderson, Jordon, Meyer)
 "Freedom's Flame" (Anderson, Meyer)
 "I Wish" (Anderson, Meyer)
 "Saturday's Rage" (Anderson, Meyer)
 "Death Or Glory" (Anderson, Jordon)
 "The Pirate Song" (Anderson, Leach)
 "You've Been Told" (Anderson, Meyer)
 "No Secrets" (Anderson, Meyer)
 The Radio Said Rock 'N' Roll Is Dead (Anderson, Meyer)

Personnel
 Angry Anderson - Lead Vocals
 Geordie Leach - Bass Guitar
 Greg Jordon - Guitar, Slide guitar
 John Meyer - Guitar
 Scott Johnston - Drums

External links

Albert Productions albums
1984 albums